Oscalín Guillermo Ferraras (born 16 February 1994), known as Guillermo Ferreras, is a Dominican footballer who plays as a defender for Atlético Pantoja and the Dominican Republic national team.

International career
Guillermo Ferreras made his international debut for Dominican Republic on 22 March 2018, being a second-half substitute in a 4–0 friendly win against Turks and Caicos Islands.

References

External links
 

1994 births
Living people
People from Barahona Province
Dominican Republic footballers
Association football central defenders
Association football fullbacks
Divisiones Regionales de Fútbol players
Dominican Republic international footballers
Dominican Republic expatriate footballers
Dominican Republic expatriate sportspeople in Spain
Expatriate footballers in Spain